The National Association of Artists' Organizations (NAAO) was, from 1982 through the early 2000s, a Washington, D.C.-based arts service organization which, at its height, had a constituency of over 700 artists' organizations, arts institutions, artists and arts professionals representing a cross-section of diverse aesthetics, geographic, economic, ethnic and gender-based communities especially inclusive of the creators of emerging and experimental work in the interdisciplinary, literary, media, performing and visual arts. At the apex of its activities, in the late 1980s and early 1990s, NAAO served as a catalyst and co-plaintiff on the Supreme Court case, National Endowment for the Arts v. Finley having spawned the National Campaign for Freedom of Expression. NAAO's dormancy in the early years of the 21st century led to the formation of Common Field.

NAAO emerged from the New Artpace conference and attendee directory held in 1978 at the Miramar Hotel in Santa Monica, CA. The National Endowment for the Arts (NEA) began funding artists' organizations, artist-run alternative spaces and artist-driven initiatives in 1973 when an extension of the Works Progress Administration (WPA), the Comprehensive Employment and Training Act (CETA), began training and supporting jobs for artists working at these sites. The NEA's Visual Arts Program supported the formation of NAAO to provide networking opportunities (national conferences and membership directories) to this emergent constituency.

NAAO led the nation into the Culture Wars of the early 1990s by responding rapidly and pro-actively through its national network of community-based arts and cultural spaces to Congressional attacks against artists' rights and freedom of expression. These attacks included the ripping of images of Andre Serrano's Piss Christ on the floor of Congress, and led to the Corcoran Gallery of Art's summer of 1989 decision to cancel the exhibition The Perfect Moment, a retrospective of works by photographer Robert Mapplethorpe. These attacks led to other incidents of arts censorship across the country, the inclusion of a "decency clause" authored by Senator Jesse Helms (R-NC) written into the grant guidelines of the National Endowment for the Arts and the cancellation of NEA grants due to content restrictions.

NAAO member organizations in 1992, as published in Organizing Artists: A Document and Directory of the National Association of Artists' Organizations, were:

ABC No Rio (New York, NY)

Acme Art Company (Columbus,. OH)

Adaptors Inc. (Brooklyn, NY)

A.I.R Gallery (New York, NY)

Aleph Movement Theatre, Inc. (Helena, MT)

Aljira, A Center for Contemporary Art (Newark, NJ)

Alliance for Cultural Democracy/ACD (Minneapolis, MN)

Alliance for the Arts (New York, NY)

Alliance of Resident Theatres/New York (New York, NY)

Allied Productions, Inc. (New York, NY)

Alternate ROOTS (Atlanta, GA)

Alternative Museum (New York, NY)

Alternative Worksite/Bemis Foundation (Omaho, NE)

American Society of Furniture Artists/ASOFA (Houston, TX)

Association of National Non-Profit Artists’ Centres/Regroupment d’artistses des centres alternatifs/ANNPAC/RACA (Toronot, Canada)

Appalshop (Whitesburg, KY

Arizona Commission on the Arts (Phoenix, AZ)

Arlington Arts Center (Arlington, VA)

Armory Center for the Arts (Pasadena, CA)

Art Attack International, Inc. (New York, NY)

Art Emergency Coalition (Philadelphia, PA)

Art In General (New York, NY)

Art Matters (New York, NY)

Art on the Tracks (Pensacola, FL)

Art Papers (Atlanta, GA)

Art Resources International (Washington, DC)

The Art Studio, Inc. (Beaumont, TX)

ARTCALENDAR (Great Falls, VA)

Artemisia Gallery (Chicago, IL

ARTFBI/Artists for a Better Image (Baltimore, MD)

Artifacts Artist Group (Miami Beach, FL)

Artifex Alternative Arts Museum (Minneapolis, MN)

Artist Trust (Seattle, WA)

Artists’ Alliance (Lafayette, LA)

Artists Space (New York, NY)

Artists Talk on Art (New York, NY)

Artists Television Access/ATA (San Francisco, CA)

Artlink, Inc. (Phoenix, AZ)

Artpaper/Visual Arts Information Service (St. Paul, MN)

Arts Center Gallery (Glen Ellyn, IL)

The Arts Exchange (Atlanta, GA)

Arts Midwest (Minneapolis, NM)

Arts on the Park (Lakeland, FL)

Artspace (Richmond, VA)

Artspace, Inc. (Raleigh, NC)

Artswatch (Louisville, KY)

Asian American Arts Centre (New York, NY)

Association of Performing Arts Presenters (Washington, DC)

Astro Artz/High Performance (Santa Monica, CA)

Atlanta Theatre Coalition (Atlanta, GA)

ATLATL (Phoenix, AZ)

Baltimore Clayworks (Baltimore, MD)

Bay Area Video Coalition (San Francisco, CA)

Bayfront NATO Center for the Arts (Erie, PA)

Beacon Street Gallery & Theatre (Chicago, IL)

Beyond Baroque (Venice, CA)

Birmingham Art Association (Birmingham, AL)

Blue Rider Theatre (Chicago, IL)

Blue Star Art Space/Contemporary Art for San Antonio (San Antonio, TX)

Boston Center for the Arts (Boston, MA)

Boulder Art Center (Boulder, CO)

Bridge Center for Contemporary Art (El Paso, TZX)

Buckham Gallery (Flint, MI)

C.A.G.E./Cincinnati Artists’ Group Effort (Cincinnati, OH)

Cactus Foundation (Los Angeles, CA)

California Confederation of the Arts (Sacramento, CA)

Capp Street Project (San Francisco, CA)

Case Western University Arts Management Program (Cleveland, OH)

Center for Arts Criticism (St. Paul, MN)

Center for Contemporary Arts of Santa Fe (Santa Fe, NM)

Center for Photography at Woodstock (Woodstock, NY)

Center for Tapestry Arts, Inc. (New York, NY)

Centro Cultural de la Raza (San Diego, CA)

Centro de Arte (Washington, DC)

CEPA/Center for Exploratory & Perceptual Art (Buffalo, NY)

Chicago Artists’ Coalition (Chicago, IL)

Cleveland Performance Art Festival (Cleveland, OH)

Clocktower/Institute for Contemporary Art/ P.S. 1 Museum (New York, NY)

Coalition of Washington Artists (Washington, DC)

Coastal Arts League Museum (Half Moon Bay, CA)

COCA/Center on Contemporary Art (Seattle, WA)

College Art Association (New York, NY)

Contemporary Art Institute of Detroit (Detroit, MI)

Contemporary Arts Center (New Orleans, LA)

COSACOSA Art At Large, Inc. (Philadelphia, PA)

Craft Emergency Relief Fund (Shelburne Falls, MA)

CRASHarts (Phoenix, AZ)

Creative Time (New York, NY)

CSPS (Cedar Rapids, IA)

Dance Bay Area (San Francisco, CA)

Dance Place (Washington, DC)

Dance Theatre Workshop/DTW (New York, NY)

Dance Umbrella (Austin, TX)

Danforth Gallery (Portland, ME)

DARE/Dallas Artists Research & Exhibition (Dallas, TX)

DCAC/District of Columbia Art Center, Inc. (Washington, DC)

Delaware Center for the Contemporary Arts/DOCA (Wilmington, DE)

Delaware Division of the Arts/Delaware State Arts Council (Wilmington, DE)

Delta Axis (Memphis, TN)

Detroit Artists Market (Detroit, MI)

Detroit Focus Gallery (Detroit, MI)

Dialogue, Inc. (Columbus, OH)

Dinnerware Artists’ Cooperative Gallery (Tucson, AZ)

DiverseWorks (Houston, TX)

Dixon Place (New York, NY)

Dover Art League (Dover, DE)

Nexus Contemporary Art Center (Atlanta, GA)

Nexus/Foundation for Today’s Art (Philadelphia, PA)

911 Media Arts Center (Seattle, WA)

Enabled Artists United (Dobbins, CA)

Exit Art (New York, NY)

Experimental Intermedia (New York, NY)

The Exploratorium (San Francisco, CA)

Eye Gallery (San Francisco, CA)

The Fabric Workshop (Philadelphia, CA)

Film Arts Foundation (San Francisco, CA)

Footwork/Dancer’s Group Inc. (San Francisco, CA)

Forum Gallery (Jamestown, NY)

Foundation for Arts Resources/FAR (Los Angeles, CA)

Franklin Furnace Archive, Inc. (New York, NY)

Friends of the Hispanic Community (Milwaukee, WI)

Full Circle Dance Co. (Washington, DC)

Fullerton Museum Center (Fullerton, CA)

Galeria de la Raza (San Francisco, CA)

Gallery Route One (Pt Reyes Station, CA)

Godzilla (New York, NY)

Gran Fury (New York, NY)

Guerrilla Girls (New York, NY)

Hallwalls Contemporary Arts Center (Buffalo, NY)

Hand Workshop (Richmond, VA)

Harvestworks, Inc. (New York, NY)

Hatley Martin Cultural Forum & The Institute for Living Arts (San Francisco, CA)

Headlands Center for the Arts (Sausalito, CA)

Helena Presents (Helena, MT)

Henry Street Settlement (New York, NY)

Hera Educational Foundation (Wakefield, RI)

Heresies (New York, NY)

Highways Performance Space (Santa Monica, CA)

Hillwood Art Museum (Brookville, NY)

Hopkins Center (Hanover, NH)

Houston Center for Photography (Houston, TX)

Howard County Center for the Arts (Ellicott City, MD)

Huntington Beach Art Center (Huntington Beach, CA)

Illinois Arts Council (Chicago, IL)

Images Center for Photography (Cincinnati, OH)

Individual Artists of Oklahoma (Oklahoma City, OK)

Installation (San Diego, CA)

INTAR International Arts Relations (New York, NY)

Intermedia Arts Minnesota (Minneapolis, MN)

International Friends of Transformative Arts (Scottsdale, AZ)

Intersection for the Arts (San Francisco, CA)

Jacob’s Pillow Dance Festival & School (Becket, MA)

John Michael Kohler Arts Center (Sheboygan, WI)

Jump-Start Performance Co. (San Antonio, TX)

Just Buffalo/Literary Center (Buffalo, NY)

Kala Institute (Berkeley, CA)

Kansas City Artists Coalition (Kansas City, MO)

Kirkland Art Center (Clinton, NY)

Kirkland Arts Center (Kirkland, WA)

KO Theatre Works, Inc. (Amherst, MA)

La Napoule Art Foundation (New York, NY)

The Lab/The.Art.Re.Grup (San Francisco, CA)

Landmark Art Projects (La Jolla, CA)

Lawndale Art Center (Houston, TX)

Laziza Videodance & Lumia Project/Spontaneous Combustion (Brooklyn, NY)

Life on the Water (San Francisco, CA)

The Light Factory (Charlotte, NC)

Light Work (Syracuse, NY)

The Loft (Minneapolis, MN)

Loft Theatre (Tampa, FL)

Los Angeles Center for Photographic Studies/LACPS (Los Angeles, CA)

Los Angeles Contemporary Exhibitions/LACE (Los Angeles, CA)

Los Angeles Poverty Department/LAPD (Los Angeles, CA)

Louisville Visual Art Association (Louisville, KY)

Lower East Side Printshop, Inc. (New York, NY)

Lower Manhattan Cultural Council (New York, NY)

Management Consultants for the Arts (Cos Cob, CT)

MARS (Movimento Artistico Del Rio Salado) Artspace (Phoenix, AZ)

Mary Street Dance Theatre (Miami, FL)

Maryland Art Place (Baltimore, MD)

Mexic-Arte Museum/Multi-Cultural Works (Austin, TX)

Mid Atlantic Arts Foundation (Baltimore, MD)

Mid-America Arts Alliance (Kansas City, MO)

Minnesota Artists Exhibition Program (Minneapolis, MN)

Mobius (Boston, MA)

Movement Research (New York, NY)

Musee D’Art Contemporain de Montreal (Montreal, Quebec)

N.A.M.E. (Chicago, IL)

NAMAC/National Alliance of Media Art Centers (Oakland, CA)

The Nathan Cummings Foundation (New York, NY)

National Artists Equity Association (Washington, DC)

National Council on Education for the Ceramic Arts (Bandon, OR)

National Jazz Service Organization (Washington, DC)

Near Northwest Arts Council (Chicago, IL)

Nevada State Council on the Arts (Reno, NV)

New Arts Program (Kutztown, PA)

New England Foundation for the Arts (Cambridge, MA)

New Harmony Gallery of Contemporary Art (New Harmony, IN)

New Langton Arts (San Francisco, CA)

New Visions Art Gallery (Atlanta, GA)

New York Experimental Glass Workshop (Brooklyn, NY)

New York Foundation for the Arts (New York, NY)

Newhouse Center for Contemporary Art/Snug Harbor Cultural Center (Staten Island, NY)

Nexus Contemporary Art Center (Atlanta, GA)

Nexus/Foundation for Today’s Art (Philadelphia, PA)

911 Media Arts Center (Seattle, WA)

Nova/New Organization for the Visual Arts (Cleveland, OH)

Ohio Arts Council (Columbus, OH)

OhioDance (Columbus, OH)

Oklahoma Visual Arts Coalition, Inc. (Oklahoma City, OK)

On the Boards (Seattle, WA)

Organization of Independent Artists (New York, NY)

Painted Bride Art Center (Philadelphia, PA)

Painting Space 122, Inc. (New York, NY)

Pentacle (New York, NY)

Performance Space 122 (New York, NY)

Philadelphia Independent Film/Video Association (Philadelphis, PA)

Photographic Resource Center (Boston, MA)

Ping Chong & Company (New York, NY)

Pittsburgh Filmmakers (Pittsburgh, PA)

Polarities (Brookline, MA)

Printed Matter, Inc. (New York, NY)

Pro Arts (Oakland, CA)

Public Art Fund, Inc. (New York, NY)

Public Art Works (San Rafael, CA)

Public Library of Cincinnati & Hamilton County (Cincinnati, OH)

Pyramid Arts Center, Inc. (Rochester, NY)

Pyramid Atlantic (Riverdale, MD)

Rachel Rosenthal Company (Los Angeles, CA)

Radical Arts Trajectory/RAT (San Francisco, CA)

Randolph Street Gallery (Chicago, IL)

Real Art Ways (Hartford, CT)

Reflex (Seattle, WA)

Resources & Counseling for the Arts (St. Paul, MN)

Rosenberg Gallery at Goucher College (Baltimore, MD)

Rotunda Gallery (Brooklyn, NY)

Roulette Intermedia, Inc. (New York, NY)

San Francisco Art Institute (San Francisco, CA)

San Francisco Arts Commission Gallery (San Francisco, CA)

San Francisco Camerawork (San Francisco, CA)

San Jose Institute of Contemporary Art (San Jose, CA)

Santa Barbara Contemporary Arts Forum (Santa Barbara, CA)

Santa Monica Museum of Art (Santa Monica, CA)

School of the Art Institute of Chicago (Chicago, IL)

School 33 Art Center (Baltimore, MD)

Sculpture Space, Inc. (Utica, NY)

Second Street Gallery (Charlottesville, VA)

Seven Stages (Atlanta, GA)

1708 East Main (Richmond, VA)

Several Dancers Core (Decatur, GA)

Skowhegan School of Painting and Sculpture (Skowhegan, ME)

Social and Public Art Resource Center/SPARC (Venice, CA)

Soundwork Northwest (Seattle, WA)

Southend Musicworks (Chicago, IL)

Southern Arts Federation (Atlanta, GA)

Southern Exposure Gallery (San Francisco, CA)

Southern Theater (Minneapolis, MN)

Southwest Craft Center (San Antonio, TX)

The Space (Boston, MA)

Space One Eleven (Birmingham, AL)

SPACES (Cleveland, OH)

Spirit Square (Charlotte, NC)

Split Rock Arts Program (Minneapolis, MN)

Squeaky Wheel/Buffalo Media Resources (Buffalo, NY)

Studio Potter Network (Exeter, NH)

Sushi Performance & Visual Art (San Diego, CA)

1708 Gallery (Chico, CA)

Texas Fine Arts Association (Austin, TX)

Tigertail Productions/Mary Luft and Company, Inc. (Miami, FL)

Touchstone Center for Crafts (Uniontown, PA)

Tulsa Artists Coalition (Tulsa, OK)

Tulsa Photography Collective (Tulsa, OK)

University Art Museum and Pacific Film Archive (Berkeley, CA)

The Urban Institute for Contemporary Arts (Grand Rapids, MI)

Video Data Bank (Chicago, IL)

Visual AIDS (New York, NY)

Visual Arts Center of Alaska (Anchorage, AK)

Visual Studies Workshop (Rochester, NY)

Volcano Art Center (Hawaii National Park, HI)

Vortex Repertory Company (Austin, TX)

Walker Art Center (Minneapolis, MN)

Walker’s Point Center for the Arts (Milwaukee, WI)

Washington Center for Photography (Washington, DC)

Washington Project for the Arts/WPA (Washington, DC)

Washington Sculptor’s Group (Berwyn Heights, MD)

Wexner Center for the Arts (Columbus, OH)

White Columns (New York, NY)

WhiteWalls (Chicago, IL)

Women & Their Work (Austin, TX)

Women’s Art Registry of Minnesota/WARM (St. Paul, MN)

Wordspace Theatre Workship/Dick Shea’s Performance Space and Barefoot Ballroom (New York, NY)

X-Communication (New York, NY)

Yellow Springs Institute (Chester Springs, PA)

Zone (Springfield, MA)

References 

Arts organizations established in 1982
Arts organizations based in Minneapolis